Stephen Edward Dearden (born 1 February 1968) is an English cricketer.  Dearden is a right-handed batsman who bowls right-arm medium pace.  He was born at Walshaw, Bury, Lancashire.

Dearden represented the Lancashire Cricket Board in List A cricket.  His debut List A match came against the Netherlands in the 1999 NatWest Trophy.  From 1999 to 2002, he represented the Board in 7 List A matches, the last of which came against Scotland in the 2nd round of the 2003 Cheltenham & Gloucester Trophy which was played in 2002.  In his 7 List A matches, he scored 211 runs at a batting average of 35.16, with a single half century high score of 67*.  In the field he took 2 catches.  With the ball, he took 10 wickets at a bowling average of 22.00, with best figures of 4/31.

He currently plays for Haslingden Cricket Club in the Lancashire League.

References

External links
Stephen Dearden at Cricinfo
Stephen Dearden at CricketArchive

1968 births
Living people
Cricketers from Bury, Greater Manchester
English cricketers
Lancashire Cricket Board cricketers